Christopher Wolfe (born 1949) is an American political scientist and Distinguished Research Scholar and former Affiliate Professor of Politics at the University of Dallas. He is also Emeritus Professor at Marquette University. Wolfe is known for his works on American judicial review and natural law public philosophy.

Life
Wolfe received his BA (summa cum laude) from the University of Notre Dame in 1971. Then He studied political philosophy at Boston College and earned his PhD in 1978. During his doctoral studies, he moved from political philosophy to American political thought and constitutional law. Wolfe taught at Assumption College (1975-1978) and then moved to Marquette University. 
He was President of the American Public Philosophy Institute (now the Dallas Forum on Law, Politics, and Culture) between 1989 and 2021.
Wolfe married Anne McGowan Wolfe in 1972 and they have had ten children.

Books
 Essays on Faith and Liberal Democracy, University Press Of America, 1986
 The Rise of Modern Judicial Review, Basic Books, 1986 (revised edition, Rowman and Littlefield, 1994)
 How to Read the Constitution, Rowman and Littlefield, 1996
 Judicial Activism, Rowman & Littlefield, 1997
 The Family, Civil Society, and the State, (ed.), Rowman and Littlefield, 1998
 Homosexuality and American Public Life (ed.), Spence Publishing, 1999
 Natural Law and Public Reason, edited with Robert George, Georgetown University Press, 2000
 Same-Sex Matters (ed.), Spence Publishing, 2000
 Liberalism at the Crossroads, edited with John Hittinger, Rowman and Littlefield, 2003
 That Eminent Tribunal: Judicial Supremacy and the Constitution (ed.), Princeton University Press, 2004
 Natural Law Liberalism, Cambridge University Press, 2006
 The Naked Public Square Reconsidered (ed.), ISI Books, 2009
 Natural Law Today: The Present State of the Perennial Philosophy, edited with Steven Brust, Lexington Books, 2018
 The Concept of Social Justice (ed.), St. Augustine's Press, 2019

References

External links

Living people
American political scientists
1949 births
Morrissey College of Arts & Sciences alumni
University of Notre Dame alumni
University of Dallas faculty
Marquette University faculty
American political philosophers
21st-century American philosophers
American anti-same-sex-marriage activists
Natural law ethicists
Assumption College faculty
Social philosophers